The True Kuhli loach (Pangio kuhlii), occasionally referred to as Eel Loach, is a small eel-like freshwater fish belonging to the loach family (Cobitidae).  They originate from the island of Jawa in Indonesia. This snake-like creature is very slender and nocturnal.

Description
The kuhli loach is an eel-shaped fish with slightly compressed sides, four pairs of barbels around the mouth, and very small fins.  The dorsal fin starts behind the middle of the body, and the anal fin well behind this.  The eyes are covered with transparent skin.  The body has 10 to 15 dark brown to black vertical bars, and the gaps between them are salmon pink to yellow with a light underside.  When the fish is not actively breeding, distinctions between males and females are not readily apparent. However, close observation will reveal that males have a more muscular upper/dorsal cross-section and their pectoral fins tend to be larger, more paddle-shaped, and often have some pigment in them. When breeding, the females often become larger than the male and their greenish ovaries can be seen through the skin before spawning. Spawning is not easy, but when it occurs a few hundred greenish eggs are laid among the roots of floating plants.  Kuhli loaches reach maturity at  inches (7 cm) and have a maximum length of 4 inches (10 cm).
This fish can live for up to about 14 years.

Habitat, diet, parameters, and related information
The natural habitat of the kuhli loach is the sandy beds of slow-moving rivers and clean mountain streams. They are a social fish and are typically found in small clusters (they are not schooling fish but enjoy the company of their species), but are cautious and nocturnal by nature and swim near the bottom where they feed around obstacles.  They natively live in a tropical climate and prefer water with a 5.5 – 6.5 pH-but will tolerate 7.0 pH in aquaria, a water hardness of 5.0 dGH, and a temperature range of 75 – 86 °F (24 – 30 °C). Kuhli loaches are scavengers, so they will eat anything that reaches the bottom. They usually feed at night, but can be taught to feed in the day in the home aquarium.

Other noteworthy information
In the wild, the fish spawn communally in very shallow water.  The kuhli loach is a bottom dweller that burrows into soft places. Its older generic name 'Acanthophthalmus' comes from the meaning 'thorn' or 'prickle-eye', after a spine beneath each eye.

Etymology of name
The kuhli loach was originally described as Cobitis kuhlii by Achille Valenciennes in 1846 to commemorate Heinrich Kuhl's work as a naturalist and zoologist. In scientific literature, it has been referred to as Acanthophthalmus kuhlii. The genus name Acanthophthalmus is a junior synonym of Pangio.

In the aquarium

While striped Pangio loaches are a common in aquaria, the true P. kuhlii is rarely, if ever, kept. This is due to the fact that they are endemic to Jawa, where collection of ornametal fish is extremely rare. There are many who doubt P. kuhlii has ever even made it into the private aquarium trade.

There are a number of species of the genus Pangio, primarily P. semicincta, that appear similar and are sold under the same name, require similar care, and are all excellently suited for household tanks. They tend to be hardy and long-lived in the aquarium and get along well with their own kind as well as others.

In an aquarium environment, especially if the gravel is suitably finely grained, Pangio species can burrow into the bottom and there remain unseen for long periods of time, emerging to eat during the night. If the gravel is later disturbed, a hobbyist might well find themselves faced with fish assumed lost a long time ago. Kuhlis may also occasionally swim into unprotected filter inlets, possibly leading to their deaths.

Breeding in captivity requires plenty of hiding spaces and consistent water quality.

See also

 List of freshwater aquarium fish species
 Java loach - Similar grayish black colored species.

References

Further reading

External links 

Loaches Online
CassiDietsch Loach Reference Pg

Pangio
Fish of Southeast Asia
Freshwater fish of Indonesia
Fish of Thailand
Taxa named by Achille Valenciennes
Fish described in 1846